Warren George Entsch is an Australian politician who has been a member of the House of Representatives from 1996 to 2007 and since 2010, representing the Division of Leichhardt. He is a member of the Liberal National Party of Queensland, and sits with the Liberal Party in federal parliament.

Early life
Entsch was born in Babinda, Queensland and served in the Royal Australian Air Force 1969–78. He was a railway porter, maintenance fitter and welder, real estate agent, farmer, grazier, crocodile catcher and company director before entering politics.

In his time outside of Parliament between 2007 and 2010, Entsch worked as an independent director on the board of CEC Group, a Cairns-based property development company, and a Director of the Australian Rainforest Foundation, a Cairns-based organisation focussing on the Daintree Rainforest.

Politics
Entsch was first elected to the House of Representatives at the March 1996 federal election. He was Parliamentary Secretary to the Minister for Industry, Science and Resources 1998–2001 and was Parliamentary Secretary to the Minister for Industry, Tourism and Resources from 2001 to 2006. He then decided on retirement, principally to spend time with his teenage son and did not contest the November 2007 election. He was a member of the Liberal Party of Queensland until the formation of the Liberal National Party of Queensland in 2008.

On 10 November 2009, Entsch announced that he would again run for pre-selection for the seat of Leichhardt and was re-elected to parliament at the August 2010 election defeating the man who had succeeded him in 2007, Labor incumbent Jim Turnour. Entsch was subsequently appointed Chief Opposition Whip by then-opposition leader Tony Abbott.

At the 2016 federal election Entsch was re-elected with 39.4% of first- preference votes marking his seventh election victory in 20 years. He was again re-elected at the 2019 Australian federal election with 37.6% of first-preference votes. He was shortly afterwards appointed to the position of "special envoy to the Great Barrier Reef" by Prime Minister Scott Morrison. He vowed to focus his efforts in this role on the issue of plastic pollution on the reef, asserting that climate change was not a threat to the existence of the Great Barrier Reef. By the end of 2019 Entsch acknowledged climate change and its impact as a serious threat to the Great Barrier Reef. In his December 2019 report to environment minister Sussan Ley he stated "Global climage change looms as the most serious existential threat to the long-term health and viability of the Reef."

In May 2019, in his re-election victory speech, claimed his own success in the legalisation of same-sex marriage: "I've been very successful in campaigning for national change. Medical cannabis was one that I was able to successfully implement, the other was same-sex marriage, which I'm very proud of."

In his role as Chair of the Parliament’s Northern Australia Committee and the Juukan Gorge Inquiry, Entsch tabled the interim report of the "Inquiry into the destruction of 46,000-year-old caves at the Juukan Gorge in the Pilbara region of Western Australia" in December 2020.

Entsch was able to retain his seat at the 2022 election.

Entsch is a member of the Moderate faction of the Liberal Party.

Support for same-sex marriage

In September 2004, Entsch publicly spoke against his party's anti-gay-marriage stance, describing laws to prevent gay marriage as "offensive" and "unnecessary". As a result of his pro-gay statements, the Family First Party – which directed their preferences to Liberal/National Coalition candidates ahead of Labor candidates in almost every other seat, nationwide – directed their preferences to Labor instead of Entsch. Nevertheless, he won re-election with an increased majority of both the primary and two-party-preferred vote.

In December 2005, he pledged support for a civil union scheme after Britain began granting civil partnerships. He was interviewed for The Pink Broad (Issue 15, published Wednesday 22 February 2006), a fortnightly gay and lesbian newspaper, in which he confirmed that he planned to sponsor a private member's bill in Federal Parliament within months that promised to eradicate discrimination and the inequities faced by Australia's gay and lesbian population under Federal law. His plan did not eventuate. In September 2010 Entsch indicated that he did not consider same-sex marriage an important issue and voted against the Australian Greens 2010 motion for members of the house to poll their constituents on the issue of same-sex marriage.

Two years later he voted against a bill sponsored by Labor’s Stephen Jones that would have legalised same-sex marriage. On 17 August 2015, in defiance of Prime Minister Abbott, Entsch introduced a private member's bill to legalise same-sex marriage in Australia, saying, "The main purpose of this bill is not a complex one. It is to give same-sex couples in Australia the same right to marry the person they love as that which is currently only granted by law to heterosexual couples. This bill is designed to promote an inclusive Australia, not a divided one. A divided nation is what we will be if we continue to allow discrimination in relation to marriage on the basis of a person's sexuality."

On 7 December 2017, Entsch spoke in favour of and voted for, the Marriage Amendment (Definition and Religious Freedoms) Bill that enabled same-sex marriage in Australia, following the plebiscite introduced by then Prime Minister Malcolm Turnbull.

References

External links

Further reading
Entsch Returns to Politics
Warren Entsch wins Leichhardt for LNP

1950 births
Australian farmers
Australian people of German descent
Australian real estate agents
Living people
Australian LGBT rights activists
Liberal Party of Australia members of the Parliament of Australia
Liberal National Party of Queensland members of the Parliament of Australia
People from Far North Queensland
Members of the Australian House of Representatives
Members of the Australian House of Representatives for Leichhardt
21st-century Australian politicians
20th-century Australian politicians